19 Mayıs Stadium may refer to football and multi-purpose stadiums in Turkey:

 Ankara 19 Mayıs Stadium
 Manisa 19 Mayıs Stadium
 Samsun 19 Mayıs Stadium